Laser Interconnect and Networking Communications System (LINCS) is a test of laser communication in space using two cubesats launched in June 2021.

Background
It was built by General Atomics for the US DOD's Space Development Agency.

The two cubesats, LINCS A/B, were launched on SpaceX's Transporter-2 rideshare in June 2021, but communications were not established by January 2022. One theory is that helium exposure during the Falcon 9 launch affected MEMS devices in the cubesats.

See also 
 Laser communication in space
 Free-space optical communication

References 

CubeSats
Laser communication in space